A travel to work area or TTWA is a statistical tool used by UK Government agencies and local authorities, especially by the Department for Work and Pensions and Jobcentres, to indicate an area where the population would generally commute to a larger town, city or conurbation for the purposes of employment.

Significance

As a measure based on urban areas and their commuter hinterland they are a form of metropolitan area, though as methods of calculation differ they cannot directly be compared with other specific measurements such as metropolitan statistical areas in the United States.

TTWAs have no legal status. However, they give planners and geographers an alternate view of urban life as their boundaries are tied not to arbitrary administrative limits but socio-economic ties. Having an idea of where people commute from for work is particularly useful for public transport planning.

Definition
Travel to work areas are defined by the Office for National Statistics using census data for commuting between wards, based on the different locations of individuals' home and work addresses.

A travel to work area is a collection of wards for which "of the resident economically active population, at least 75% actually work in the area, and also, that of everyone working in the area, at least 75% actually live in the area".  According to this measure, there were 243 TTWAs within the United Kingdom in 2007.

2007
The 243 TTWAs were:

2011
The TTWAs were recalculated from 2011 census data. There are now 228 areas as follows:

The State of the Cities
Travel to work areas were selected to approximate city regions as one of the main units of comparison used by the 2006 State of the English Cities report and database, commissioned and maintained by the Communities and Local Government department of the UK Government.

This has greatly increased the amount of information available about travel to work areas, although the State of the Cities only publishes data for the 56 travel to work areas based around primary urban areas in England. Travel to work areas in Scotland and Wales and those covering only rural areas are not included.

To increase the range of statistics available the State of the Cities also publishes data for travel to work areas approximated to local authority boundaries. These areas can differ considerably from the more accurate ward-based areas.

See also 
 Commuting zone
 Daily urban system
 Housing Market Area, a related concept in the UK
 Metropolitan area, a more general concept of a travel to work area
 Primary urban area

References

External links 
 Office for National Statistics
 Map of UK TTWAs: Interactive Map
 UK 1997 Census tables using TTWAs
 Travel to work in the UK (2016)

Geography of the United Kingdom
Office for National Statistics
Employment in the United Kingdom
Types of subdivision in the United Kingdom
Transportation planning
Transportation geography
Commuting